Chernookovo may refer to the following places in Bulgaria:

Chernookovo, Dobrich Province
Chernookovo, Shumen Province